Szarki  is a village in the administrative district of Gmina Krzepice, within Kłobuck County, Silesian Voivodeship, in southern Poland.

The village has a population of 269.

References

Szarki